Karaköy is a quarter of the city Bolu, Bolu District, Bolu Province, Turkey. Its population is 4,127 (2021).

References

Populated places in Bolu District